Phyllocnistis atranota is a moth of the family Gracillariidae. It is known from New South Wales, Australia.

The wingspan is about 5 mm. Adults have a fringe of hairs around the edge of each wing. The fore wings are shiny white with a pair of gold chevrons on each wing and a black dot on each wing tip.

The larvae feed on Alphitonia excelsa. They probably mine the leaves of their host plant.

References

Phyllocnistis
Endemic fauna of Australia